Suzanne Rigg (née Youngberg, born 29 November 1963) is an American-born long-distance runner who had dual American/British citizenship. She represented Great Britain in the women's marathon at the 1996 Atlanta Olympics. She also won a team silver medal at the 1992 IAAF World Half Marathon Championships and finished fourth in the 10,000m at the 1994 Commonwealth Games.

Personal life
Rigg was raised in Essex, Iowa and attended Iowa State University where she met British student, John Rigg, who won a gold medal in the men's 4 × 400 metres relay at the 1985 European Junior Championships. After graduating, the two married and went to live in Liverpool, England, before settling in Warrington, where Rigg was a member of Warrington AC. They have two children.

Rigg moved back to the USA with her family in 2007. In 2012, she became girls cross-country and distance head coach at Zionsville Community High School in Indiana.

Competition record

References

External links 
 
 
 

1963 births
Living people
Athletes (track and field) at the 1996 Summer Olympics
British female long-distance runners
British female marathon runners
Olympic athletes of Great Britain
Athletes (track and field) at the 1994 Commonwealth Games
Commonwealth Games competitors for England
People from Page County, Iowa
Track and field athletes from Iowa